Counterpoint was a Canadian current affairs television series on English-French Canadian relations which aired on CBC Television in 1967.

Premise
This Montreal-produced series highlighted Quebec culture in an effort to encourage harmony between English and French Canadians. For example, a segment showed francophone customers of a British-themed tavern while anglophones ate at a French bistro. Film, jazz and women's hockey in Quebec were also featured. While the series tended to promote culture more than politics, an interview with federal cabinet minister Jean-Luc Pépin was featured in one episode.

Counterpoint was hosted by journalist Armande Saint-Jean and actor-producer Arthur Garmaise.

Scheduling
This half-hour series was broadcast on Sunday afternoons from 12 February to 18 June 1967, initially at 2:30 p.m., and changed to the 2:00 p.m. time slot from 16 April.

References

External links
 

CBC Television original programming
1967 Canadian television series debuts
1967 Canadian television series endings
Television shows filmed in Montreal